Mary Elizabeth Mann, née Rackham, (14 August 1848 – 19 May 1929) was a celebrated English novelist in the 1890s and early 1900s. She also wrote short stories, primarily on themes of poverty and rural English life. As an author she was commonly known as Mary E. Mann.

Life

Mary Rackham was born in Norwich to a merchant family on 14 August 1848. and she was baptised on 17 September in Heigham Parish Church in Norwich. Little is known about her early years, although Taylor states that she spent much of her childhood in the imposing family residence of Town Close House.

After her marriage on 28 September 1871 to Fairman Joseph Mann, a farmer with 800 acres, she moved to Shropham,  Norfolk.  Her husband was a churchwarden and A parish guardian; she also became involved with the workhouse, and visited the sick and other unfortunates of the parish, her observations and experiences informing her stories. Sutherland notes that lived in Norfolk her whole life, and wrote about the rural life in East Anglia that she knew so well.

She took up writing in the 1880s in order to relieve the tedium of daily life in what must have been, after her upbringing in Norwich, a remote and uninteresting country village. Her literary efforts were initially guided by Thomas Fairman Ordish, the son of her husband's sister, a literary-minded civil servant who became a notable Shakespearian scholar. Mann published her first novel, The Parish of Hilby (1883) at her own expense, probably on commission. and it was well received by the critics. Man refused an offer of £12 from the Family Herald to serialise the book. Kemp notes that her early fiction was published anonymously.

This began a career that spanned more than thirty years during which she published thirty three novels, hundreds of short stories, and fourteen plays, of which at least two were staged in London. Her work was largely focused on the experiences of rural life in Norfolk from labourers to yeoman farmers during the late 19th century agricultural and economic upheaval.

She had four children, one boy and three girls. After her husband's death in 1913, she moved to Sheringham, where she died aged 80. Her grave is in the churchyard of St Peter and St Paul, Shropham. Her grave-marker is a carved open book with the epitaph  We bring our years to an end, as if it were a tale that is told.

Works
Shropham was renamed 'Dulditch' in her novels, reflecting her view of the village as isolated and bleak. She wrote Tales of Dulditch while living at Manor Farm which inspired her view of rural life during the early 20th century. Formerly regarded as a novelist belonging to the ‘earthy’ rural genre, her short stories in Tales of Victorian Norfolk are grim but authentic accounts of poverty and deprivation.  Often described by some as Norfolk's Thomas Hardy, Mann was admired by D. H. Lawrence. 
 
Novels include Mrs Day's Daughters, and The Patten Experiment (1899) where a group of well-meaning middle class folk try to live on a labourer's wage for a week.

Her work has recently been rediscovered as a major contributor to East Anglian literature, championed among others by A. S. Byatt, who in 1998 included her story Little Brother in The Oxford Book of English Short Stories. Byatt said that she had been introduced to Mann's writings by D. J. Taylor. Taylor suggests that this is one of the grimmest stories in Victorian fiction. In the story a mother gives the corpse of a still-birth boy to her living children to play with as a doll.  Byatt calls the story plain, and brief, and clear and terrible though the narrator's tone is not simple. Byatt goes on to say that Mann is recording, not judging but her telling is spiky with morals and the inadequacy of morals.

Taylor, who wrote the entry for Mann in Oxford Dictionary of National Biography in 2004, considers her best work to be not her novels but short fiction written in the 1890s such as Ben Pitcher's Elly, Dora o' the Ringolets and The Lost Housen, arguing them to be the equal of Hardy's but based on a matter-of-fact mood rather than Hardy's "vengeful determinism". These stories are collectively known as the Dulditch stories, and Taylor wrote a foreword to an anthology of thirty two of her Dulditch stories in 2008 as The Complete Tales of Dulditch. Taylor considers that it was Mann's first-hand observation of a community enmired in the 1880s agricultural depression that gives her best work its sheen. Richard King in The Tatler also considered that Mann was a writer whose greatest success lay in her short stories. The Scotsman said of her short stories that . . . Mann, has the talent of making her comedies, and tragedies complete and impressive within brief compass; and most of them have a touch of originality.

Mann's work can be grim and unpleasant. The Times notes that she did not shirk from showing the ugliness of life whether describing the rich or poor. Part of Mann's grimness come from her refusal to sugar-coat reality or ignore the most probable outcomes. The Scotsman said that Mann . . . never evades a logical conclusion. Her personages may not always suggest a very flattering view, of human nature, but such as they are, their fortunes are conducted with a scrupulous regard for probability, and there are no attempts to play tricks with the emotions of the reader, at the expense of his intelligence. The lost heir is a recurring trope in Victorian fiction. G. A. Henty had one of his heroes stolen as a toddler, and another lost to his father's family but both acquire, through fortunate circumstances, the manners and polish of gentlemen, rather than being what one would expect from their upbringing in the workhouse or as fisher-lads. In contrast, when the lost child is discovered in Mann's The Victim (1917) the child is exactly what her experience of neglect, the workhouse, domestic service, and an unsatisfactory husband could be expected to make her, a foul-mouthed slattern.
 
Some of Mann's novels continue to be republished. In 2005 Eastern Angles Theatre Company used a collection of her characters and stories to create a new play A Dulditch Angel.  It was directed by Orla O'Loughlin and written by Steven Canny.

Longer Works by Mann
The following list is based on searches at Jisc Library Hub Discover. The list is not necessarily exhaustive. Note that at the time of posting (12 August 2020) there are only two books by Mann on Project Gutenberg, whereas the British Library has eleven titles available online and the Hathi Trust ten, five of which are in common.

Notes

References

External links
Simple tales of country folk, DJ Taylor, The Independent, 7 October 2000
 Sinister tales of the countryside, Eastern Daily Press, May 18, 2001
 

1848 births
1929 deaths
English women novelists
Writers from Norwich
19th-century English writers
19th-century English women writers
19th-century British writers